Puha or Puhatikotiko is a locality between the Waipaoa River and the Waikohu River in the Gisborne District of New Zealand's North Island. It is located close to the confluence of the two rivers on State Highway 2 close to Te Karaka, inland from the city of Gisborne.

A notable resident was Te Kani Te Ua.

References

Populated places in the Gisborne District